Gilberto Hernández Ortega (21 December 1923 – 23 October 1979) was an artist from the Dominican Republic. He is considered a leading painter of his generation.

Early life and education
He was born in Baní, Peravia Province, in 1923 but was raised in Santo Domingo. He was great-grandson of Pierre André Frier, a Frenchman.

Ortega first studied art under Celeste Woss y Gil at her private academy. Undecided about his career, he studied engineering for more than two years before committing to pursuing painting. He enrolled in the National School of Fine Arts, where he studied under Woss y Gil once again, as well as Josep Gausachs and George Hausdorf. Ortega was particularly influenced by Gausachs, maintaining a close relationship with the older artist until Gausachs's death in 1959. In addition to Gausachs, he worked closely with Jaime Colson and Clara Ledesma. Other sources of inspiration included Cuban artists Wifredo Lam and Mario Carreño Morales.

Career

In 1946, Ortega had his first solo exhibition, exhibiting 63 paintings and drawings. He also exhibited abroad, with his first international solo exhibition being held in Caracas, Venezuela, in 1951. Other international shows included exhibitions in the United States, Spain, Argentina, Brazil, Israel and Taiwan. In addition, he was awarded prizes in national Biennial art events in 1952, 1958 and 1974.

He also taught art for many years. Ortega became a professor at the National School of Fine Arts in 1946 and was named vice director in 1954. In 1966, he opened a private art school in Santo Domingo. During his many years of teaching, Ortega had a significant influence on major Dominican artists, including Ada Balcácer, Iván Tovar, Ramón Oviedo and Elsa Núñez.

While primarily a Surrealist, he also experimented with Expressionism and Abstraction. Most of Ortega's paintings are figurative, depicting distorted human forms. Although dark colors such as blues, violets, grays, greens, browns and black predominate, his palette is often enlivened with vibrant yellows, oranges and reds.

Death
Ortega died in Santo Domingo in 1979.

See also

 List of Dominican painters

References

 De los Santos, Danilo, Memoria de la pintura dominicana, Volumen 3, Santo Domingo: Grupo León Jimenes, 2004.
 De los Santos, Danilo, Memoria de la pintura dominicana, Volumen 4, Santo Domingo: Grupo León Jimenes, 2004.
 Staff (undated).  "Gilberto Hernández Ortega 1924–1978" (in Spanish).  Museo Bellapart.  Retrieved August 24, 2013.
 Urena Rib, Fernando, La Magia Oculta del Tropico: Gilberto Hernandez Ortega. Latin American Art Museum. Retrieved May 18, 2013

External links

1923 births
1979 deaths
Academic staff of the National School of Fine Art
Dominican Republic male artists
Dominican Republic people of French descent
20th-century Dominican Republic artists
20th-century Dominican Republic painters
Male painters
20th-century male artists
Art educators
Founders of educational institutions
People from Baní
People from Santo Domingo
Surrealist artists